Sisters of the Sea is a South Korean weekday morning television drama that aired on MBC from August 1, 2005 to January 27, 2006. The series followed the lives of the Song sisters.

Cast

Main characters
Go Jung-min as Song Jung-hee
Kim So-eun as young Song Jung-hee
Lee Yoon-ji as Song Choon-hee 
Lee Se-young as young Song Choon-hee
Kim Chan-woo as Kang Dong-shin
Lee Sung-min as young Kang Dong-shin
Lee Hyung-chul as Woo Choong-geun
Kim Seung-hyun as young Woo Choon-geun

Supporting characters
Kim Hyun-joo as Kim Soon-young
Yoon Gi-won as Kim Seok-goo
Jung Won-jung as Jung Myeong-jin 
Yeo Woon-kay as Cho Han-bin
Cha Joo-ok as Jung Min-ja
Jang Tae-sung as Jung In-chul
Noh Hyun-hee as Woo Choong-hee
Jung Han-yong as Song Tae-il
Kyeon Mi-ri as Lee Geum-bok
Na Han-il as Jang Ho-sik

References

Korean-language television shows
MBC TV television dramas
2005 South Korean television series debuts
2005 South Korean television series endings
South Korean romance television series